Germany–Serbia relations are foreign relations between Germany and Serbia.  Both countries established diplomatic relations on 18 January 1879. Germany has an embassy in Belgrade. Serbia has an embassy in Berlin and five general consulates (in Frankfurt, Hamburg, Munich, Stuttgart and Düsseldorf).  There are around 505,000 people of Serbian descent living in Germany. Germany is a European Union member state and Serbia is a European Union candidate.

History

The origin of Serbian-German relations can be traced to the Middle Ages. Serbian Grand Prince Stefan Nemanja and Emperor Frederick I had a meeting in modern-day Niš in the 12th century. During the rise of Serbian medieval state, Saxon miners were brought to Serbia in order to further expand the mining industry, which was the main source of wealth and power of Serbian rulers. Saxons were given certain privileges for their work.

Culture of Serbs in Habsburg monarchy was largely influenced by German culture, and a part of Serbs were subjected to Germanisation. Due to German influences and several other reasons, Serb cultural model was reshaped and looked up to those of countries of Central Europe.

The Principality and the Kingdom of Serbia held strong relations with Germany. Most Serbian engineers and technical experts were educated in Germany or in German-speaking countries, and German was the required language in related higher education institutions. Munich was an important education center for Serb painters. German architects also influenced the Architecture of Serbia. Serbian civil and trade laws, as well as organisation of University of Belgrade, was influenced by German models.

Relations of the two countries were on a very low level after the World War I, but trading and joint businesses never stopped.

In the interwar period, German political and cultural influence became less relevant, as France became the primary influence on Kingdom of Yugoslavia, and French culture was favored by Serb elites. However, under Stojadinović's reign, Yugoslavia became closer to Nazi Germany and moved away from its traditional allies, France and Great Britain. In the later years, Yugoslavia joined the Tripaltite Pact. A total of 62 PhD theses were defended by Serbian intellectuals in the German language between the two world wars, of which 31 were in the domain of economics. A number of students of the University of Belgrade held German scholarships in the 1930s. Between 1937 and 1940, around 50 Yugoslav citizens studied in Germany, second only to France in the number of foreign students. A number of professors obtained their postgraduate degrees in Germany as well.

Country comparison

Notes

See also 
 East Germany–Yugoslavia relations
 Foreign relations of Germany
 Foreign relations of Serbia 
 Accession of Serbia to the European Union
 Germany–Yugoslavia relations
 Serbian–Sorbian relations
 Serbs in Germany

References

Sources

External links 
 German embassy Belgrade (in German and Serbian only)
  Serbian embassy in Berlin
  Serbian Ministry of Foreign Affairs about relations with Germany
 German Federal Foreign Office about relations with Serbie

 
Serbia
Bilateral relations of Serbia